Douglas North is a House of Keys constituency in Douglas, Isle of Man.  It elects 2 MHKs.

MHKs & Elections
This information is incomplete.

External links
Constituency maps and general election results

Constituencies of the Isle of Man